The Amphitheatre is one of the geographical features of the Northern Drakensberg, South Africa, and is widely regarded as one of the most impressive cliff faces on earth. The cliff face of the Amphitheatre is roughly three times the size of the total combined area of all the cliff faces in Yosemite's famous El Capitan, and more than 10 times the size of El Capitan's most famous (South Western) face. It is part of the Royal Natal National Park.

Another trail to the foot of the Tugela Falls starts at Royal Natal National Park. The easy seven kilometre gradient up the Tugela gorge winds through indigenous forests. The Tugela Falls, which is situated at the top of the Amphitheatre, has been described as a "highlight of Drakensberg".

In 1964, film director Cy Endfield shot the exterior locations in the mountainous Drakensberg National Park for the epic war film Zulu starring Michael Caine and Stanley Baker. The set for the British field hospital and supply depot at Rorke's Drift was created by the Tugela River with the Amphitheatre in the background.

See also 
 Drakensberg
 Tugela Falls
 Royal Natal National Park

References

External links
 Guided Drakensberg Trekking & Hiking

Drakensberg
Landforms of KwaZulu-Natal
Landforms of South Africa
Cliffs
Landforms of Africa